Uhrovec is a village and municipality in the Bánovce nad Bebravou District of  the Trenčín Region of Slovakia.

History
In historical records, the village was first mentioned in 1258.

Geography
The village lies at an altitude of 258 metres and covers an area of 22.95 km². It has a population of 1478 people. It lies in the Strážovské vrchy mountains, in the Radiša river valley, around 8 km from Bánovce nad Bebravou and 30 km from Trenčín

Notable people
Ľudovít Štúr, Slovak politician in the 19th century, leader of the Slovak national revival
Alexander Dubček, Slovak politician in the second half of the 20th century
Both were born in the same house - building of local school.
Karl Sovanka, painter and sculptor
János Fadrusz, sculptor, started to learn in the sculptor-school in Uhrovec

Twin towns — sister cities

Uhrovec is twinned with:
 Gilowice, Poland
 Kiskunfélegyháza, Hungary
 Modrá, Czech Republic
 Slavičín, Czech Republic

References

External links

Municipal website 

Villages and municipalities in Bánovce nad Bebravou District